Marco Almaviva (born January 23, 1934) is an Italian painter.

Almaviva was born in Novi Ligure (Province of Alessandria, Italy). His father, Armando Vassallo, a leading sculptor of the 20th-century style, the first teacher and close friend of Francesco Messina, was one of the most representative of the close of figurativists who shone by their research potential and originality, mostly inspired by the classicism and archaic/modernizing that were supreme in 1930s Italy . By the time Vassallo moved from Genoa to Novi, he had taken part in two Venice Biennals (1928 and 1930), and the 1925 Exposition des Arts Décoratifs in Paris; he had established relationships and worked with major exponents of art and culture, from Adolfo Wildt to Arturo Martini, from Edgar Wood to Rino Valdameri, Giovanni Pastrone and Gabriele D'Annunzio, on the poster of the major film Cabiria. By this time, Vassallo had already begun to express dissent with fascist regime as far as art was concerned, and this was to lead to him openly criticising its leaders and his consequent exclusion from the public exhibition circuit. Vassallo's last showing was in September 1933 together with Arturo Martini, with whom he shared the pressing need to Italian art and sculpture.

Almaviva has processed the dramatic events his father lived through into one of the reasons for demystifying artistic officialdom, a feature of his entire career.

1963–1966

Almaviva attended Francesco Messina's studio in Brera, Milan. This was when he came into contact with Gino Ghiringhelli, Dino Buzzati, Carlo Carrà and Lucio Fontana. The Milano period very soon led Almaviva to define his artistic itinerary just as he was subjecting himself to unconditional critical scrutiny as to what he had acquired not only in art but in much broader terms, every idea that could provide a global view of the world, too. The need of self-generated research which, by definition, does not use 'known' languages not even those of the avant-garde movements, stemmed from the basic idea of immersing the part of what existed that could be accomplished into the sphere of the biological, which is dominated by violence and injustice, and compared to which everything that has been acquired in art or by metaphysical projection is elusive or consolatory. Faced with the drama of existence, of dominating the Zöe, the whole contemporary debate on art (avant-gardism or tradition; figurative or abstract)  and its role seemed secondary to Almaviva.

1967–1968
Almaviva develops Tonaltimbrica, which provides an original translation of the character of irrepressible biological antagonism. Its formal structure consists in a reduction to the extreme of the two components that make up the "tonal" element, the colouristic base which identifies the masses in the background, and the "timbric", the weft of pure, immediate intractable colour that gives it a particularly aggressive look as though the shapes were reaching outward to the onlooker. In Milan Almaviva exhibits Palpito primordiale (Primordial Beat) at the Rotonda Besana, and holds his first one-man show at the Galleria Einarte in Corso Buenos Aires.

1969–1970
He opens Galleria Amaltea in Genoa, a documentation centre for his work. There emerges a more pronounced need for autonomy also by means of a dialectic exchange with avant-gardism that were appearing in the city.

1971–1979 
In 1971 Filoplastica was born, a structure whose form was the channeling off, through a sinuous gossamer-thin filament which symbiotically enlivens the tonal element of the background, of the code that had been honed in Tonaltimbrica in an atmosphere of suspension and tenuousness of the mark of the painting. The phyloplastic outcome means that the block caused by fruitless witnessing and denunciation, seen in the poetics of Tonaltimbrica is partly overcome prefiguring globalism - which is possible since Filoplastica itself has a secular outlook of openness to knowledge - which absorbs the very dimension of the biological and leads it to being the manifestation if a crystalline substance, indefinitely plastic and tenuous. The theoretical definition of Filoplastica is continued in Genoa, fully independently from the dominating artistic currents and the critique which was then considered militant, by a series of 50 one-man shows up to now (Almaviva does not take part in collectives or award-winning events).

1979–2007
He continues his work and research in Tuscany, in his home/atelier in Buggiano noting that he is also interested in the cultural promotion of public bodies and museums both in terms of a 'deconstructional'-approach analysis of today's developments in the debate on art at international level, but also the habits of and processes towards legitimisation used by today's critique establishment.

References

Notes

1934 births
Living people
People from Novi Ligure
20th-century Italian painters
Italian male painters
21st-century Italian painters
20th-century Italian male artists
21st-century Italian male artists